Transcription termination factor 2 is a protein that in humans is encoded by the TTF2 gene.

This gene encodes a member of the SWI2/SNF2 family of proteins, which play a critical role in altering protein-DNA interactions. The encoded protein has been shown to have dsDNA-dependent ATPase activity and RNA polymerase II termination activity. This protein interacts with cell division cycle 5-like, associates with human splicing complexes, and plays a role in pre-mRNA splicing.

Interactions 

TTF2 has been shown to interact with CDC5L.

References

Further reading